Sir Thomas Edward Gordon  (12 January 1832 – 23 March 1914) was a Scottish soldier, diplomat, and traveller. A British Army officer, he fought in India, served as a diplomat in Tehran, and travelled across the Pamirs. He is primarily remembered as an author of several books about India, Persia (modern-day Iran), and Central Asia of the 19th century.

Early life

Gordon was born on 12 January 1832 in Aberdeen and was a twin son of Captain William Gordon (1788–1834) of the 2nd Queen's Royal Regiment. His father had served in the Peninsular War and was married at Santarém, in 1818, to Marianna Carlotta Loi Gonçalves de Mello, daughter of Luiz Gonçalves de Mello, a Spanish government official in the province of Estremadura.

His father William Gordon was one of the sons of Adam Gordon (1750–1831) of Griamachary in the parish of Kildonan, Dingwall, whose sons and grandsons included thirteen commissioned officers, a Surgeon-General, Huntly George Gordon; and a Lord Advocate and MP, Edward Gordon, Baron Gordon of Drumearn.

He and his twin brother, Sir John James Hood Gordon, were the youngest children in a family of four sons and a daughter. The twins were educated at the Scottish Naval and Military Academy, Edinburgh. Thomas Edward and John joined the British Army on the same day; both became generals and were knighted.

Army career

Alongside his twin brother, Thomas entered the British Army, joining the 29th (Worcestershire) Regiment of Foot on 21 August 1849. He transferred to the Army in India and served in the Indian Mutiny campaign of 1857–1858.

In 1873–1874, he participated in the Second Yarkand Mission led by Thomas Douglas Forsyth. The main goal of the expedition was to meet Yakub Beg, the ruler of Chinese Turkestan. Gordon also joined a party that travelled west to the Pamirs and Wakhan. Gordon was accompanied on the mission by John Biddulph, Ferdinand Stoliczka, Henry Walter Bellew, Henry Trotter, and R. A. Chapman. In 1876 Gordon published his account of the expedition.

In 1889 he became Oriental Secretary to the British Legation in Tehran and was Military Attaché, 1891–93. During his visits to Persia Gordon decided to publish an account of his journey with the intention of displaying, through his observations and illustrations, evidence of the "progress and improvement" he found. In 1896 his work, Persia Revisited, was published.

On 1 April 1894, he was promoted full general and placed on the Unemployed Supernumerary List of the Indian Staff Corps.

Personal life

In 1862, Gordon married firstly, Mary Helen Sawers, daughter of Alexander Sibbald Sawers.  They had four daughters, Helen Elizabeth (1863–1942), Alexa Anna (9 January 1867 –  18 November 1867), Jeanetta (1876–1963), and Violet Mary (1878–1972), and a son who died in childhood, Thomas William Gordon (1868–1876).

Mary Helen died in 1879 and he married secondly in 1894, Charlotte Davison.

He was also a painter, perhaps the first European to paint the landscapes of certain remote locations of the Pamirs.

Gordon died in 1914 at his home in Kensington.

Bibliography

 The roof of the world: being a narrative of a journey over the high plateau of Tibet to the Russian frontier and the Oxus sources on Pamir – includes an eyewitness account of Yaqub Beg's regime in Kashgaria
 Persia Revisited
 A varied life; a record of military and civil service, of sport and of travels in India, Central Asia and Persia, 1849–1902

References

External links

 
 

Scottish diplomats
29th Regiment of Foot officers
Explorers of Central Asia
1832 births
1914 deaths
Knights Commander of the Order of the Bath
Companions of the Order of the Star of India
Knights Commander of the Order of the Indian Empire
Scottish explorers
Scottish soldiers
Scottish travel writers
Scottish landscape painters
People from Aberdeen
19th-century Scottish writers
19th-century Scottish painters
Scottish male painters
20th-century Scottish painters
Scottish knights
19th-century British Army personnel
Military personnel of British India
Scottish twins